Weston Township is one of the nineteen townships of Wood County, Ohio, United States.  The 2010 census found 2,336 people in the township.

Geography
Located in the western part of the county, it borders the following townships:
Washington Township - North
Plain Township - East
Liberty Township - South-Eastern corner
Milton Township - South
Richfield Township, Henry County - South-Western corner
Damascus Township, Henry County - West
Grand Rapids Township - Northwest

Part of the village of Weston is located in southeastern Weston Township.

Name and history
Weston Township was established in 1830. It is the only Weston Township statewide.

Government
The township is governed by a three-member board of trustees, who are elected in November of odd-numbered years to a four-year term beginning on the following January 1. Two are elected in the year after the presidential election and one is elected in the year before it. There is also an elected township fiscal officer, who serves a four-year term beginning on April 1 of the year after the election, which is held in November of the year before the presidential election. Vacancies in the fiscal officership or on the board of trustees are filled by the remaining trustees.

The Weston Township Hall is located at the intersection of Euler and Van Tassel roads, just north of Weston.

References

External links
County website

Townships in Wood County, Ohio
Townships in Ohio